The Finest is a compilation album by British rock band Fine Young Cannibals, released in 1996 by London Records (under the FFRR brand name) and licensed in the United States to MCA Records. It includes tracks from the band's two studio albums Fine Young Cannibals (1985) and The Raw & the Cooked (1989), plus a track from the film Something Wild and three new tracks.

The album's cover art was created by Anton Corbijn. It has sold 600,000 copies worldwide, excluding the United States.

Track listing
All tracks written by Roland Gift and David Steele, except where noted.

Charts

Weekly charts

Year-end charts

Certifications

References

1996 compilation albums
Fine Young Cannibals albums
London Records compilation albums